Robert J. Bauman is a Canadian jurist who is the Chief Justice of British Columbia and Chief Justice of the Court of Appeal for the Yukon. Prior to his appointment as the Chief Justice of British Columbia, he served as the Chief Justice of the Supreme Court of British Columbia.

References

External links 
 Law Society welcomes new Chief Justice

1950 births
Living people
Judges in Yukon
Judges in British Columbia
Lawyers in British Columbia
People from Toronto
University of Toronto alumni